Oddities, Abnormalities and Curiosities is the sixth studio album by American hardcore punk band Circle Jerks, released June 20, 1995 by Mercury Records. It is the band's last studio album to date.

Oddities, Abnormalities and Curiosities was the band's only full-length studio recording since their 1990 disbandment and 1994 reformation, and also their only release on a major label. The reunion of the Circle Jerks did not last; after several internal problems and guitarist Greg Hetson's involvement with Bad Religion, they split up again but have since reunited on numerous occasions. The album moves away from the band's usual hardcore punk style and instead features a traditional punk rock style.

Background
The album was produced by Niko Bolas, known for his work with Neil Young, Warren Zevon, Melissa Etheridge and Kiss.

"I Wanna Destroy You," a cover of a song by the Soft Boys, featured backing vocals from pop singer/songwriter Deborah Gibson, who had just finished a solo album with the same producer the Circle Jerks were using. Gibson later made a surprise appearance at a Circle Jerks performance at punk mecca CBGB to perform the song with the band. The video for the song was also featured on an episode of Beavis and Butt-Head.

The lyrics for "Dog" were taken directly from the opening monologue of the 1985 Lasse Hallström film My Life as a Dog, and referenced Soviet space dog Laika.

The cover art is a distorted photo of microcephalic circus performers Zip and Pip (Elvira and Jenny Lee Snow), who were famed for their roles in the controversial 1932 MGM film Freaks.

Track listing
 "Teenage Electric" – 2:44
 "Anxious Boy" – 2:06
 "22" – 2:42
 "Shining Through the Door" – 3:01
 "I Wanna Destroy You" (The Soft Boys cover) – 3:05
 "Sinking Ship" – 3:45
 "Brick" – 2:14
 "Fable" – 3:37
 "Dog" – 2:53
 "Grey Life" – 2:48
 "Exhaust Breath" – 3:00
 "Career Day" – 2:23

Release and reception

In an AllMusic review, Paul Tinelli called it "an excellent hard rock album with few weak spots along the way." Steve Kuhn of the Washington City Paper criticized the cover of "I Wanna Destroy You" calling it "lackluster" and said "the remaining majority of Oddities, if not exactly revolutionary, is perfectly adequate." Rolling Stone gave the album three stars and called it "a perfectly respectable hard-rock album."

Personnel
Keith Morris - lead vocals
Greg Hetson - guitars
Zander Schloss - bass, guitars, sitar
Keith Clark - drums, backing vocals
Dix Denney - guitars
Suzi Gardner - backing vocals
Debbie Gibson - backing vocals (on "I Wanna Destroy You")
Niko Bolas - production, engineering, mixing
John Paterno - engineering
Brian Soucy - assistant engineer
Paul Q. Kolderie & *Sean Slade - remixing
Mary Hogan - production coordination
Darrin Ehardt - art direction, design

References

Sources

  
   
   

1995 albums
Circle Jerks albums